Paul Cartledge is an English record producer specializing in media based projects including advertising, television, film, radio and digital.

He grew up in the Punk scene in the North West of England, playing in various bands. He was taken under the wing of Tony Visconti, record producer to David Bowie among others, and became the studio manager of Visconti's 'Good Earth Studios' in London. There he worked with many rock and pop artists including The Moody Blues, Elaine Paige, Les Rita Mitsouko, The Alarm, Big Audio Dynamite, Paul Oakenfold & Steve Osbourne with Happy Mondays, Captain Sensible, The Jesus and Mary Chain, Hazel O'Connor, Bros, S'Express, Derek B, and Ed Buller.

He went on to work for Joe & Co, the music production company owned by Joe Campbell & Paul Hart. He became house engineer and worked with many artists including Pink Floyd, Robert Plant, Dusty Springfield, Jon Secada, Roy Wood, Carl Wayne, Stephanie Lawrence, Ralph McTell, Georgie Fame, Charles Aznavour, Chrissie Hynde, Dead or Alive; his highest profile engineering credits being on two records, produced by Phil Ramone, for Frank Sinatra. He pioneered ISDN recording techniques and used this in work on film soundtracks, including Steven Zaillian's Searching for Bobby Fischer and Henry Selick's James and the Giant Peach, produced by Tim Burton. Notable actors he has recorded include James Coburn, Sir Robert Stephens, Sir Ben Kingsley, Pete Postlethwaite, and David Thewlis.

At the beginning of the 21st century, Cartledge teamed up with Harrison Birtwistle protogé Philip Jewson, to compose and produce music for the British cult drama Urban Gothic, and has since worked with Jewson on an array of music for media projects. Together they own the Soho-based music production company 'Yellow Boat Music Limited'.

He has kept the connection with Visconti alive recording vocals on a duet "No Other God" between Placebo frontman Brian Molko And Kristeen Young, on the Visconti produced album X and is mentioned in his autobiography, Bolan, Bowie and the Boy from Brooklyn.

Record credits

References

Living people
English record producers
Year of birth missing (living people)